Kataragama Bodhiya (also called Ashta Pala Ruha Bodhiya, Ananda Bodhiya) is a sacred fig (Bo tree) located in Kataragama, Sri Lanka.

History 
An old tree with historical and religious significance, it is believed to be planted in the 3rd century BC by the Kshatriyas of Kataragama, during the reign of king Devanampiyatissa of Anuradhapura. Kataragama Bodhiya is believed to be one of the first eight saplings that emerged from Jaya Sri Maha Bodhi in Anuradhapura, which were planted in different places of the island around the 3rd century BC.

Present day 
Today Kataragama Bodhiya is venerated by thousands of Buddhist devotees who are on pilgrimage to Kataragama sacred town. This Bodhi tree is located very close to the Ruhuna Maha Kataragama Devalaya, an ancient temple which dedicated to Kataragama deviyo, a deity venerated by Buddhists, Hindus and other religious believers. Another old sacred fig known as "Kadawara Bodhiya" is located in close proximity to the Kataragama Bodhiya. It is identified as a Pariwara Bodhiya of the main Kataragama Bodhiya.

See also
 Bodhi tree
 Kalutara Bodhiya
 Matara Bodhiya

References

External links
 Kataragama Bodhiya (Buddhist Places in Sri Lanka)

Individual trees in Sri Lanka
Buddhism in Sri Lanka
Anuradhapura period
Buddhist pilgrimage sites in Sri Lanka
Individual fig trees